For the mountain pass between Chile and Argentina, see Pampa Alta Pass (Puesto Viejo).

Puesto Viejo is a town and municipality in Jujuy Province in Argentina.

References

Populated places in Jujuy Province